Casey Charles is an American lawyer, activist, academic, and author. He is a professor Emeritus from the English Department at the University of Montana, and an adjunct professor of English at the University of California, Riverside.

Charles is most known for articulating queer nuances in literature and made significant contributions to HIV awareness through his essays, memoir, and poetry. He writes across genres and has authored eight books, including two poetry chapbooks, two novels—The Trials of Christopher Mann and The Monkey Cages—as well as a collection of essays on film and literature, a book of nonfiction and a memoir. His work has primarily focused on LGBTQ rights and representation.

Charles was the Editor of Cedilla 6 in 2012.

Education
Charles completed his Bachelor's in English Literature from the University of California, Santa Cruz followed by a Master's in English Literature from San Francisco State University. He obtained his law degree from Hastings College of Law and earned his PhD in English Literature from the State University of New York at Buffalo in 1992.

Career
Charles began his academic career in 1982 as a Lecturer in English Composition at San Francisco State University where he taught until 1986, while also conducting a civil trial practice in the San Francisco Bay Area. He joined the State University of New York at Buffalo in 1987 as a Teaching Assistant, held that position for four years, and was then appointed as a Visiting assistant professor at the University of Oregon in 1992 for a year. Subsequently, he held an Adjunct appointment as a professor at Washington State University at Vancouver and served as a Visiting assistant professor at Lewis and Clark College from 1993 to 1994. He taught at University of Montana from 1994 to 2019. As of 2020, he holds an appointment as an Adjunct faculty member of the English Department at the University of California, Riverside, and has also been serving as Professor Emeritus in the Department of English at the University of Montana since 2021.

Charles served as Chair of the Department of English at the University of Montana from 2006 to 2009, where he taught gay and lesbian studies course at the University of Montana and became a founding member of the Western Montana Gay and Lesbian Community Center as well as the Outfield Alliance at the university in Missoula.

Research
Charles has authored numerous publications, including articles in peer-reviewed journals, book chapters, novels, and poetry. His research interests span the fields of law, literature, and human rights with a special emphasis on LGBTQ representation.

Critical queer nuances in literature and law
While investigating the emergence of queer nuances in early modern theater, he highlights the presence of homoerotic connotations in Renaissance literature. On the subject of same-sex attraction in Shakespeare's Twelfth Night, he proposes not to adopt contemporary ideas of sexual identities, but to understand the dynamic of the play as dramatizing the fluidity of sexual attraction and gender norms. Later, in his assessment of sexual implications in Shakespeare's Sonnet 20, he discusses the way the text is subject to both an openly homoerotic presentist interpretation and at the same time a more historicist approach.

In The Sharon Kowalski Case: Lesbian and Gay Rights on Trial, part of the Famous American Trial Series out of Kansas, he presents a history of one of the earliest legal struggles for same-sex domestic custody rights. His book Critical Queer Studies: Law, Film, and Fiction in Contemporary American Culture examines the fields of contemporary queer studies in the context of literature, law, and film. In his review, Stephen Craig Kerry, states the book's essays present ‘critical queer study’ of real/fictional characters and the legal-filmic discursive fields which frame them” in a way that “transports these characters from their time to ours." He also commended how the book integrated diverse subjects (literature, law, and film) and harmonized them with stories related to gender, sex, and sexuality.

The power dynamics in identity politics underline the importance of a healthy discourse in framing the fight for civil rights. By applying a critical queer studies approach to examine the investigation of hate crimes against gay men and queer community in general, his research identifies the influence of ideological fiction(s), particularly the discursive intersection between law, media, and theater, on the current legal framework.

HIV long-term survival
Charles's literary works are also focused on raising awareness about HIV/AIDS and exploring the feelings of anger, fear, and resistance that are felt by individuals living with the virus. Through his poems, including the collections Blood Work and Zicatela, he stresses the importance of showing support and compassion to those affected by HIV/AIDS and calls for a more empathetic and inclusive society.

In the anthology HIV, Sex and Sexuality in Later Life, which he co-edited, Charles's two ethno-essays recount the resilience of HIV communities in Nairobi, Kenya, and Mumbai, India. While commenting on this book, Michael W. Ross said "HIV has become a largely ‘forgotten’ disease, with most individuals who experienced and survived the pandemic now in their 50s and 60s." He then praised how the book provides detailed insights into the challenges faced by long-term HIV survivors.

Fiction
Charles first novel, The Trials of Christopher Mann, tells the story of law student wrestling with his sexual orientation against the historical backdrop of the trial of Dan White for the murder of Harvey Milk in 1979. The Monkey Cages, his second novel published in 2018, also engages law and sexuality by setting its love story between coach and student in the historical context of the notorious homosexual scandal in Boise, Idaho in 1955.

Awards and honors

2003 – Publishing Triangle Award Finalist, Nonfiction (The Sharon Kowalski Case)
2005 – National Writers Union Prize, National Writers Union
2007 – Second Prize, Muriel Craft Bailey Memorial Award
2007 – Missoula Independent's Best Books of the Year (Controlled Burn)
2010 – Poetry Award, Washington Square

Bibliography

Books
The Sharon Kowalski Case: Lesbian and Gay Rights on Trial (2003) ISBN 9780700612666
Controlled Burn (2009) ISBN 1589985052
Blood Work (2012) ISBN 9781622293131
Critical Queer Studies: Law, Film, and Fiction in Contemporary American Culture (Gender in Law, Culture, and Society) (2012) ISBN 9781409444060
The Trials of Christopher Mann (2013) ISBN 9781619290860
The Monkey Cages (2018) ISBN 9781590216491
Zicatela (2018) ISBN 9780931053344
HIV, Sex and Sexuality in Later Life (2022) ISBN 9781447361978 (editor and contributor)

Selected articles
Charles, C. (1992). Heroes as Lovers: Erotic Attraction Between Men in Sidney's" New Arcadia". Criticism, 34(4), 467–496.
Charles, C. (1997). “Gender Trouble in Twelfth Night.” Theatre Journal, 49(2), 121–141.
Charles, C. (1998). “Was Shakespeare Gay? Sonnet 20 and the Politics of Pedagogy.” College Literature, 25(3), 35–51.
Charles, C (2005) “Queer Writes,” Women's Studies in Communication, 28:1, 32–56.
Charles, C (2006) “Panic in The Project,” Law & Literature, 18:2, 225–252.

References

Living people
University of California, Riverside faculty
University of Montana faculty